The Man Who Wasn't There is a 1983 American 3-D comedy film directed by Bruce Malmuth and starring Steve Guttenberg.

Plot
When he accidentally takes possession of a top-secret invisibility potion while en route to his wedding, government bureaucrat Sam Cooper finds himself engulfed in a madcap free-for-all as Russians and other bad guys try to get the substance. To elude the Reds, his own State Department bosses and his livid fiancée, Cooper takes the vanishing juice himself—which only makes matters worse.

Critical Reception
Movie historian Leonard Maltin declared the picture a "BOMB" (his lowest possible rating) and noted that "...Better writing, directing, and acting can be found at your average nursery-school pageant."

Cast
 Steve Guttenberg as Sam Cooper  
 Jeffrey Tambor as Boris Potemkin  
 Art Hindle as Ted Durand   
 Morgan Hart as Amanda
 Lisa Langlois as Cindy Worth  
 William Forsythe as Pug Face Crusher  
 Bruce Malmuth as Fireplug Crusher  
 Ron Canada as Barker
 Michael Ensign as Assistant Secretary
 Richard Paul as Pudgy Aide
 Miguel Ferrer as A Waiter

References

External links

1983 films
1983 3D films
1983 comedy films
American 3D films
American comedy films
Films about invisibility
Films directed by Bruce Malmuth
Films set in Washington, D.C.
Films shot in Washington, D.C.
Paramount Pictures films
Films scored by Miles Goodman
1980s English-language films
1980s American films